The Commodore 64x is a replica PC based on the original Commodore 64, powered by x86 Intel processors ranging from the Intel Atom to the Intel Core i7. It was sold by Commodore USA starting in April 2011. Because Commodore USA went out of business after the death of its founder, Barry Altman, this machine as originally intended to be configured with Extreme and Ultimate models was not readily available with Commodore branding for a period of several years until it was publicly relaunched in June 2022.[8][9] The Kickstarter was hit with a cease and desist letter from Italian Commodore Engineering who have since apologized with the result being the crowdfunding campaign going back online and achieving Kickstarter's Project We Love status.[10][11]

History 

The case of the C64x was designed to resemble the popular Commodore 64 in response to "overwhelming demand" from Commodore USA's customer base.

Volume production started in May 2011, with machines being released on to the market in June 2011 at a starting price of US $595 for the Basic model and up to US $895 for an Ultimate model, and as of August 13, an Extreme version fitted with an Intel Core i7 chip with 8 GB DDR3 RAM and 3 TB hard drive for US $1499. There was a case-only version of the C64x called the Barebones available for US $295. The Barebones is currently available for £129 from UK-based My Retro Computer which purchased the injection molds from the Altman estate.[9] A VIC20 colorway C64x, never previously available, is now an option using those molds. In the intervening years in which it was largely out of public view, original hardware accessories were developed for the C64x case such as a fan grill, internal exhaust pipe, Raspberry Pi 4 mounting kit, and vent plate.[9][12] PC Gamer which reported on how to build in the Barebones case after Commodore USA had already folded announced the official return of the Commodore 64x from My Retro Computer in 2022.[13][14]

It shipped initially with Ubuntu 10.10 Desktop Edition, and in November 2011, Commodore USA released their own Linux derivative called Commodore OS.

Software 

The C64x is said to come bundled with Ubuntu 10.10. There is no hardware compatibility with the original C64, with software compatibility provided through the use of an emulator. Ubuntu is able to run VICE, an open source program which emulates 8-bit computers, such as the Commodore 64. VICE is available for free for almost all operating systems currently in use.

As of 18 August 2011, Commodore USA announced it would be providing international keyboards and keys for its customers worldwide for the C64x, with new keyboards made with additional keys for countries/languages if it is needed. For customers outside of its main US support area, keys and keycap pullers will be provided for easy self-installation.

References 

8. "c64x: Case Barebone C64x". Archived from the original on 2020-08-08. Retrieved 2022-07-16.
9. "My Retro Computer". Retrieved 16 July 2022.
10. "Commodore 64 Returns As A PC Gaming Powerhouse With An Intel CPU And GeForce GPU". 17 June 2022. Retrieved 16 July 2022.
11. "Copy of letter from the Director of Commodore". 15 June 2022. Retrieved 16 July 2022.
12. "Commodore USA Product Support Page: Driver and Software Support Page". Retrieved 16 July 2022.
13. Dexter, Alan (Maximum PC) (31 March 2015). "How to Build a Modern Commodore 64 PC | PC Gamer". PC Gamer. Retrieved 16 July 2022.
14. Corrigan, Hope (22 June 2022). "These Commodore 64 PC prebuilds are pricy, but the case looks great for DIY | PC Gamer". PC Gamer. Retrieved 16 July 2022.

 Future models, planned for 2011

See also 

Comm5